Eugene Madden (June 5, 1890 – April 6, 1949) was a pinch hitter in Major League Baseball. He played for the Pittsburgh Pirates in 1916. In 371 minor league games, he played outfield and second base.

References

External links

1890 births
1949 deaths
Pittsburgh Pirates players
Baseball players from West Virginia
Bradford Drillers players
Hattiesburg Woodpeckers players
Galveston Pirates players
Galveston Sand Crabs players
Syracuse Stars (minor league baseball) players
Newark Bears (IL) players
People from Ohio County, West Virginia